Cleveland Circle is a surface light rail station on the MBTA Green Line C branch, located in the Brighton neighborhood of Boston, at Cleveland Circle. Cleveland Circle station is handicapped accessible, with raised platforms to accommodate low-floor trams.

History

The Beacon Street line opened in 1889; most streetcars ran through Cleveland Circle to Lake Street after 1896, with some terminating at the Chestnut Hill Carhouse (renamed Reservoir Carhouse around 1900). A waiting room was originally located in a leased building at the southeast corner of Cleveland Circle; it was heavily damaged by fire on December 10, 1897, and the West End Street Railway allowed the property to revert to the owner.

In 1915, the route was cut back to Reservoir, at the Reservoir Carhouse. Around 1947, the terminus was redesignated Cleveland Circle after the adjacent traffic circle, to differentiate it from the nearby commuter rail station – which, twelve years later, would become a streetcar station itself. Although Cleveland Circle is no longer a traffic circle, the station retains its name.

In the early 2000s, the MBTA modified key surface stops with raised platforms for accessibility. Portable lifts were installed at Cleveland Circle around 2000 as a temporary measure. The platform modifications - part of a $32 million modification of thirteen B, C, and E branch stations - were completed around 2003. On May 2, 2007, the MBTA added a wooden mini-high platform on the outbound side, allowing level deboarding from older Type 7 LRVs. These platforms were installed at eight Green Line stations in 2006–07 as part of the settlement of Joanne Daniels-Finegold, et al. v. MBTA. The ramp was removed in July 2020 during a track reconstruction project.

References

External links

MBTA - Cleveland Circle
 Cleveland Circle Station from Google Maps Street View

Brighton, Boston
Green Line (MBTA) stations
Railway stations in Boston
Railway stations in the United States opened in 1889